The 2011 Mid-American Conference men's basketball tournament was the post-season basketball tournament for the Mid-American Conference (MAC) 2010–11 season.  Sixth-seeded Akron defeated Kent State in the MAC tournament final in overtime and represented the MAC in the NCAA tournament where they lost in the first round to Notre Dame.

Format
Each of the 12 men's basketball teams in the MAC receives a berth in the conference tournament.  Teams are seeded by conference record with the following two-team tiebreakers:
 Head-to-head competition
 Division record (10 games)
 Winning percentage vs. ranked conference teams (top to bottom, regardless of division, vs. common opponents regardless of the number of times played)
 Coin flip

For multiple team ties:
 Total won-lost record of games played among the tied teams
 Two-team tie-breaker procedure goes into effect

Once a three-team tie has been reduced to two teams, the two-team tiebreaker will go into effect.

The top four seeds receive byes into the quarterfinals.  The winners of each division are awarded the #1 and #2 seeds.  The team with the best record of the two receives the #1 seed.  First round games will be played on campus sites at the higher seed.  The remaining rounds will be held at Quicken Loans Arena.

Bracket

Asterisk denotes game ended in overtime.

Tiebreakers

Championship game
In the championship game, Akron defeated Kent State 66–65. Senior Brett McKnight led Akron with 15 points and scored the final two points of the game, hitting two free throws to put his team up by one. With 12 seconds to go in the overtime period, Kent State had the ball and a chance to win, but Zeke Marshall blocked Kent State's first attempt and the second attempt was deflected. As Akron celebrated after the final buzzer, one of the Kent State players, who had laid down on the court in disappointment, was accidentally stepped on by the jumping mob of Akron players, and a slight skirmish broke out after his teammates came to his defense.

The Akron Zips advanced to their third NCAA Tournament of the Division I era. They would go on to lose to Notre Dame in their first game.

All-Tournament Team
Tournament MVP – Zeke Marshall, Akron

References

Mid-American Conference men's basketball tournament
Tournament
MAC men's basketball tournament
MAC men's basketball tournament
Basketball in Cleveland